Nicolas Naaman, SMSP (June 22, 1911, Damascus, Syria – August 20, 1982) was an archbishop of the Melkite Greek Catholic Archeparchy of Bosra and Hauran in Syria.

Life
Nicolas Naaman was ordained priest on August 15, 1937, and was a member of the Missionary Society of Saint Paul (SMSP). He received his appointment as Archbishop of Bosra and Hauran on 23 August 1967. Archbishop Mikhayl Assaf of the Melkite Greek Catholic Archeparchy of Petra and Philadelphia in Amman(Jordan) consecrated him bishop on October 8, 1967, and his co-consecrators were Archbishop Paul Achkar and Archbishop Joseph Tawil. Naaman was by over 14 years Archbishop and co-consecrator of Habib Bacha, and was succeeded by Archbishop Boulos Nassif Borkhoche.

Ceremony
The Lebanese journalist and editor Naji Naaman founded in 2007, on the occasion of the 25th anniversary of the death of Nicolas Naaman, the "Archbishop Nicolas Naaman Prize for human virtues".

References

External links
 Catholic-hierarchy.org
 Gcatholic.org

1911 births
1982 deaths
Melkite Greek Catholic bishops
Syrian archbishops
Syrian Melkite Greek Catholics
People from Damascus
Eastern Catholic bishops in Syria